The Seneca Creek Greenway Trail is a  long trail that runs along Seneca Creek from the Potomac River to Watkins Mill Road, with some parts maintained by the state of Maryland and some parts maintained by Montgomery County, MD

State maintained section 
The 16.5 mile state-maintained portion of the Seneca Creek Greenway Trail starts at the Potomac River near Riley's Lock. it goes by the ruins of the Seneca stonecutting mill and runs along Tschiffely Mill Road for about a mile. The trail then crosses River Road and goes a short distance on Berryville Road, where the off-road portion of the trail begins. The trail continues past Darnestown Road, Blackrock Mill and Clopper Lake until it reaches Maryland Route 355.

County maintained section 
The state-run portion of the trail ends at Maryland Route 355.  The county portion is a 7.8-mile natural-surface trail that continues to the north.  Follow the trail under the bridge, then cross the creek on the bridge to get to a gravel parking area.  From there the trail runs to Watkins Mill Road, where there is also a parking area. The trail continues north to its end at Watkins Road, but you can continue to Damascus Recreational Park on the Lower Magruder Trail.

References 

Hiking trails in Maryland
Protected areas of Montgomery County, Maryland